E80 can refer to:

 European route E80
 King's Indian Defense, Encyclopaedia of Chess Openings code
 Toyota Corolla (E80), a car
 Abukuma Kōgen Road, route E80 in Japan